Seppo Arimo Kääriäinen (born 29 March 1948 in Iisalmen maalaiskunta) is a Finnish politician of the Centre Party and Doctor in Social Sciences.  He served as the Minister of Defence of Finland between from 24 June 2003 to 19 April 2007. He has been MP since 1987 and was Minister of Trade and Industry and Minister at the Ministry of Foreign Affairs in 1993–1995. He also served as the First Deputy Speaker of the Parliament of Finland.

References 

1948 births
Living people
People from Iisalmi
Centre Party (Finland) politicians
Ministers of Trade and Industry of Finland
Ministers of Defence of Finland
Members of the Parliament of Finland (1987–91)
Members of the Parliament of Finland (1991–95)
Members of the Parliament of Finland (1995–99)
Members of the Parliament of Finland (1999–2003)
Members of the Parliament of Finland (2003–07)
Members of the Parliament of Finland (2007–11)
Members of the Parliament of Finland (2011–15)
Members of the Parliament of Finland (2015–19)
Recipients of the Order of the Cross of Terra Mariana, 1st Class